The Mountain East Conference (MEC) is a college athletic conference affiliated with the National Collegiate Athletic Association (NCAA) at the Division II level and officially began competition on September 1, 2013. It consists of 12 schools, mostly in West Virginia with other members in Maryland and Ohio.

Formation and history

The conference is an offshoot of the West Virginia Intercollegiate Athletic Conference (WVIAC), another Division II conference that had operated primarily in West Virginia since 1924. In June 2012, the nine football-playing schools in that conference announced plans to break away and form a new all-sports conference. The schools that made the initial announcement were the University of Charleston, Concord University, Fairmont State University, Glenville State College, Seton Hill University, Shepherd University, West Liberty University, West Virginia State University, and West Virginia Wesleyan College. All of these schools were in West Virginia, except for Seton Hill, located in Pennsylvania. According to regional media, the split was "supposedly rooted in different philosophies of progressivism", and also was partially driven by a desire to expand the new conference's footprint outside West Virginia. The divisions in the WVIAC were also rooted in the split between public and private schools, although the departing schools included institutions of both types.

At the time of the original announcement, the nine schools planned to expand to at least 12 members. Before the official launch of the conference on August 20, 2012, the MEC sought to add the WVIAC's other Pennsylvania member, the University of Pittsburgh at Johnstown; however, both Seton Hill and Pittsburgh–Johnstown chose to join the Pennsylvania State Athletic Conference. The MEC filled out its charter membership with another West Virginia school, Wheeling Jesuit University, today known as Wheeling University; two Ohio schools, Notre Dame College and Urbana University; and the University of Virginia's College at Wise (UVA Wise), located in Southwest Virginia. Wheeling Jesuit was a WVIAC member that had been left out of the original WVIAC split. Urbana and UVA Wise were members of the Great Midwest Athletic Conference (G-MAC) in 2012–13, while Notre Dame was a Division II independent that had housed five of its 22 sports in the Great Lakes Intercollegiate Athletic Conference. UVA Wise, which had previously been turned down for WVIAC membership, was transitioning from the NAIA and did not officially become an active D-II member until 2015-16; all of the other charter members were already full D-II members.

At its launch, the MEC had 11 football members, with Wheeling (then known as Wheeling Jesuit) being the only non-football school. On February 15, 2013, the NCAA accepted the MEC as its 25th D2 conference. The 2015–16 school year was the first in which MEC teams were eligible for automatic bids to NCAA Division II championships; before then, they were eligible only for at-large bids.

In 2018 UVA Wise and the South Atlantic Conference jointly announced on April 13 that UVA Wise would leave the MEC to join the SAC for 2019–20 and beyond. Next, Shepherd and the PSAC jointly announced on June 7 that Shepherd would join the PSAC in 2019, becoming that league's first full member outside of Pennsylvania. The MEC would replace both members in the ensuing months. On July 5, the Mountain East Conference announced that Frostburg State University had accepted an offer of membership beginning with the 2019–20 academic year, contingent upon Frostburg State achieving active membership status in NCAA Division II (which would occur on the announced schedule). Finally, on August 30, the MEC announced two additional new members effective in 2019–20. Davis & Elkins College would become a full member, and the University of North Carolina at Pembroke would join in five sports. UNC Pembroke began MEC competition in men's and women's indoor track & field, women's swimming & diving, and wrestling in 2019, with football following in 2020.

The most recent MEC membership changes were announced in 2020. On April 16, multi-sport associate member UNC Pembroke announced it would join Conference Carolinas effective in 2021–22. Because CC sponsors all of the non-football sports that UNCP housed in the MEC, UNCP is now an MEC member only in football. Five days later, charter member Urbana announced it would close at the end of the 2019–20 school year. Finally, on June 5, Alderson Broaddus University, a West Virginia school left out of the WVIAC split, announced that it would leave the G-MAC to join the MEC the following month.

Chronological timeline
 2013 - The Mountain East Conference was founded. Charter members included the University of Charleston, Concord University, Fairmont State University, Glenville State College, Notre Dame College of Ohio, Shepherd University, Urbana University, the University of Virginia's College at Wise (UVA Wise), West Liberty University, West Virginia State University, West Virginia Wesleyan College and Wheeling Jesuit University (now Wheeling University), effective beginning the 2013-14 academic year.
 2019
 UVA Wise left the MEC to join the South Atlantic Conference (SAC), effective after the 2018-19 academic year.
 Davis & Elkins College and Frostburg State University joined the MEC, effective in the 2019-20 academic year.
 The University of North Carolina at Pembroke (UNC Pembroke) joined the MEC as an associate member for men's and women's indoor track & field, women's swimming & diving and wrestling, effective in the 2019-20 academic year.
 2020
 Alderson Broaddus University joined the MEC, effective in the 2020-21 academic year.
 UNC Pembroke added football to its MEC associate membership, effective in the 2020 fall season (2020-21 academic year).
 2021 - UNC Pembroke left the MEC as an associate member for men's and women's indoor track & field, women's swimming & diving and wrestling, effective after the 2020-21 academic year.

Member schools

Current members
The Mountain East currently has 12 full members, split evenly between private and public schools.

Notes

Associate member
The Mountain East currently has one associate member, which is also a public school:

Former members
The Mountain East had three former full members, all but one were public schools:

Former associate member
Current Mountain East football associate UNC Pembroke had housed four sports in the MEC before it joined a conference that sponsored all of those sports.

Membership timeline

Sports
The MEC sponsored 16 sports in all, eight each for men and women, at its formation. Women's lacrosse became the 17th conference sport for the 2014–15 school year (2015 season). Men's and women's swimming and diving were added as the 18th and 19th conference sports for 2017–18, with the MEC and Great Midwest Athletic Conference (G-MAC) forming a swimming and diving alliance that conducts a joint conference championship meet. The following school year saw the MEC add acrobatics & tumbling as an official sport, two years before it was added to the NCAA Emerging Sports for Women program. The MEC was the first NCAA conference to establish acrobatics & tumbling as an official sport. The most recently added sports are men's and women's indoor track & field and wrestling, which debuted in 2019–20.

Men's sponsored sports by school

Women's sponsored sports by school

Other sponsored sports by school

In addition to the above:
 Alderson Broaddus considers its cheerleaders (male and female) to be varsity athletes.
 Charleston considers its female cheerleaders (but not its male cheerleaders) to be varsity athletes.
 Glenville State considers its female cheerleaders (but not its male cheerleaders) to be varsity athletes. It also fields men's and women's teams in the non-NCAA sport of boxing.
 Notre Dame fields varsity teams in the non-NCAA sports of men's bowling and men's rugby.
 Wheeling fields a varsity team in the non-NCAA sport of men's rugby.

References

External links

 
Sports leagues established in 2012
2012 establishments in West Virginia
Harrison County, West Virginia